Kunovice Airport  is an international airport located about 5 km (3 mi) from Uherské Hradiště, Czech Republic in the town of Kunovice. The airport is home to three aircraft manufacturers: Czech Sport Aircraft, Evektor-Aerotechnik and Let Kunovice. There are currently no scheduled flights operating to the airport.

See also

List of airports in Czech Republic

Airports in the Czech Republic
Uherské Hradiště District